The 2022 Open Comunidad de Madrid was a professional tennis tournament played on clay courts. It was the 1st edition of the tournament which was part of the 2022 ATP Challenger Tour. It took place in Madrid, Spain between 11 and 27 April 2022.

Singles main-draw entrants

Seeds

 1 Rankings are as of 4 April 2022.

Other entrants
The following players received wildcards into the singles main draw:
  Roberto Carballés Baena
  Miguel Damas
  Lucas Pouille

The following player received entry into the singles main draw using a protected ranking:
  Sebastian Ofner

The following players received entry into the singles main draw as alternates:
  Duje Ajduković
  Mathias Bourgue

The following players received entry from the qualifying draw:
  Raúl Brancaccio
  Oleksii Krutykh
  Johan Nikles
  Yshai Oliel
  Oriol Roca Batalla
  Pedro Sousa

The following player received entry as a lucky loser:
  Javier Barranco Cosano

Champions

Singles

  Pedro Cachín def.  Marco Trungelliti 6–3, 6–7(3–7), 6–3.

Doubles

 Adam Pavlásek /  Igor Zelenay def.  Rafael Matos /  David Vega Hernández 6–3, 3–6, [10–6].

References

Open Comunidad de Madrid
April 2022 sports events in Spain
2022 in Spanish tennis
2022 in Madrid